Eisfelder Talmühle is an isolated junction station between the Selketalbahn and the Harz narrow gauge mainline (Harzquerbahn). In Deutsche Reichsbahn of the GDR days it had large refreshment rooms and staff. It is still however a busy interchange at certain times of the day when steam trains and railcars converge from three directions to allow passengers to make connections.

References

Railway stations in Thuringia
Transport in the Harz
Buildings and structures in Nordhausen (district)
Railway stations in Germany opened in 1898